Duleek/Bellewstown is a Gaelic Athletic Association club based in Duleek, in County Meath, Ireland. The club plays football in Meath GAA competitions. Duleek won the Meath Senior Football Championship once in 1943 and was their only Senior Football Championship wins. The club currently competes at intermediate  level. Over recent years a plan has been put in place for the renewal of the club grounds including many new amenities such as state of the art flood lights a second full size pitch, an astro and many more.

Honours

Meath Senior Football Championship: 1
1943
Meath Intermediate Football Championship: 5
 1939, 1955, 1966, 1978, 2005
 Meath Junior Football Championship 3
 1921, 1935, 1995

External links
Official Web site

Gaelic games clubs in County Meath
Gaelic football clubs in County Meath